Oliver Morris (born 11 June 1886, date of death unknown) was a British gymnast. He competed in the men's team all-around event at the 1920 Summer Olympics.

References

1886 births
Year of death missing
British male artistic gymnasts
Olympic gymnasts of Great Britain
Gymnasts at the 1920 Summer Olympics
Sportspeople from Birmingham, West Midlands